The Walk of Fame of Cabaret is a sidewalk between Proviant-Magazin and Schönborner Hof in Mainz, Germany,  which is embedded with more than 40 seven-pointed irregularly shaped stars featuring the names of cabaret celebrities selected by a group of experts and honored by several sponsors for their contributions to the cabaret culture.

The first stars, awarded on July 16, 2004, were inaugurated in the presence of Christina Weiss, Culture Representative and Minister of State of Germany and Kurt Beck, the premier of the German federal state of Rhineland-Palatinate. In January 2007, Peter Hammerschlag was honored, and his became the 43rd star on the walk.

Characteristics 
The Walk of Fame runs north to south between Münsterstraße and Schillerstraße.

Each star consists of a stainless-steel seven-pointed irregularly shaped star, inlaid into a bronze square. Inside the star, the signature of the honoree is etched. The full name of the honoree in capital letters can be seen on the bronze square, as well as the sponsor in normal letters.

The committee of experts initially selected 80 deceased stars to be honored on the walk of fame. Additionally to these, each year a living author or interpreter receives a star.

Details on the honorees  
Details on the honorees may be found at the nearby Stiftung Deutsches Kabarett (German Cabaret Foundation). Here, the core of the German Cabaret Archive is formed by more than eighty literary estates with biographies, documents and cultural heritage, regarding eighty thousand people from the history of cabaret and the forms of comedy that preceded it. This archive is based on the private initiative of Reinhard Hippen (1961). The counterpart of the "Walk of Fame" can be found in the "Hall of Fame" in the Bernburg castle, in Saxony-Anhalt. Numerous exhibits remind viewers of the "immortals" of cabaret.

List of stars 
Of all the nominated people, the following stars have been created:

External links 

 Official site: Dossiers in English

Kabarettists
Cabaret in Europe
Cabaret
Mainz
Halls of fame in Germany